Theodoros Veniamis is a Greek shipowner and president of the Greek Union of Shipowners (Enosi Ellinon Efopliston).

References

Living people
Businesspeople from Chios
Greek businesspeople in shipping
1950 births